Scyllaea is a genus of nudibranchs. They are marine gastropod molluscs in the family Scyllaeidae.

The slugs live on floating algae like Sargassum, where they have the same color and shape as the alga and can hardly be seen by predators. They feed on hydrozoa growing on the alga.

Species
Species in the genus Scyllaea include
 Scyllaea fulva Quoy & Gaimard, 1824
 Scyllaea pelagica Linnaeus, 1758
Species brought into synonymy
 Scyllaea dracaena Kelaart, 1858: synonym of Scyllaea fulva Quoy & Gaimard, 1824
 Scyllaea edwardsii A. E. Verrill, 1878: synonym of Scyllaea pelagica Linnaeus, 1758
 Scyllaea grayae A. Adams & Reeve, 1850: synonym of Scyllaea pelagica Linnaeus, 1758
 Scyllaea quoyi Gray, 1850: synonym of Scyllaea fulva Quoy & Gaimard, 1824
Nomina dubia
 Scyllaea ghomfodensis Forskål, 1775 
 Scyllaea lamyi Vayssière, 1917

References

 Gofas, S.; Le Renard, J.; Bouchet, P. (2001). Mollusca, in: Costello, M.J. et al. (Ed.) (2001). European register of marine species: a check-list of the marine species in Europe and a bibliography of guides to their identification. Collection Patrimoines Naturels, 50: pp. 180–213

External links 
 Slugsite.us - Scyllaea pelagica Linnaeus, 1758
 Jaxshells.org - Scyllaea pelagica Linnaeus, 1758 Sargassum Nudibranch And Egg Strands

Scyllaeidae